Dexter Devon Reid Jr. (born March 18, 1981) is a former American football safety. He was drafted by the New England Patriots in the fourth round of the 2004 NFL Draft after playing his college football at the University of North Carolina. Reid is a two-time Super Bowl champion, having won a trophy with the Patriots and Indianapolis Colts in 2005 and 2007 respectively.

High school career

Reid attended Granby High School in Norfolk, Virginia where he was an honorable mention All-USA Today selection, the district Player of the Year and first-team all-state selection as a senior making 62 tackles, 3 interceptions and 5 blocked field goals. He also played quarterback on offense and had 1,400 yards total offense.

In his career, he passed for 2,000 yards and 20 touchdowns along with 960 yards rushing and 12 scores.

In addition, he competed in track and basketball, winning the state triple jump title as a senior and earning a two-time all-district selection in basketball.

College career

After being redshirted in 1999 as a freshman, Reid served as a backup safety, playing primarily special teams in 2000. He finished the season fifth on the team with 69 tackles (35 solo) and recorded a fumble recovery, an interception and 6 pass deflections.

In 2001, he started all 13 games and ended the season third on the team with 99 tackles (67 solo), 5 tackles for loss, 2 sacks, 2 interceptions—one of which he returned for a touchdown-5 pass break-ups and a fumble recovery.

As a junior in 2002, Reid started all 12 games at free safety and earned first-team All-ACC honors as he finished second in the nation with 13.8 tackles per game. He recorded a total of 166 tackles, just five shy of the school record of 171 set by linebacker Buddy Curry in 1979 and also set a school record for tackles by a defensive back with his 119th stop against the University of Maryland. In addition, Reid also had 6 tackles for loss, a sack, 2 forced fumbles and 4 pass break-ups.

As a senior in 2003, Reid first-team All-ACC honors for the second straight season, compiling  132 tackles (95 solo), 3.5 tackles for loss loss and 3 pass break-ups.

He majored in management and information systems.

Professional career

New England Patriots

Reid was drafted in the 4th round (113th overall) by the New England Patriots in 2004.

Starting two games his rookie season appearing in 13 regular season games, he recorded 23 tackles (15 solo), 2 pass break-ups and a forced fumble. He also played in three play-off games and won a Super Bowl ring despite blowing a coverage that resulted in a Greg Lewis touchdown in Super Bowl XXXIX.

On August 29, 2005, Reid was released by the Patriots.

Indianapolis Colts
He was promptly signed by the Indianapolis Colts three days later.

Playing for the Colts in 2005, Reid was active for 16 games, recording 10 tackles (8 solo) and a forced fumble. In 2006, he was active for 10 regular season games, starting one and finished the season with 11 tackles (all solo) and 2 pass break-ups. He was also active throughout the playoffs and won his second ring in Super Bowl XLI.

NFL Career Statistics

Games

Defensive Interceptions

Fumbles

Sacks and tackles

Personal life

Reid's father, Dexter Reid Sr., played basketball at Virginia Tech and Granby High School.

References

External links
 

1981 births
Living people
American football safeties
Indianapolis Colts players
New England Patriots players
North Carolina Tar Heels football players
Players of American football from Norfolk, Virginia
African-American players of American football
21st-century African-American sportspeople
20th-century African-American people